Martina F. Callaghan is an Irish medical physicist who is the Director of the Wellcome Centre for Human Neuroimaging at the UCL Queen Square Institute of Neurology. Her research considers the development of in-vivo histology using MRI.

Early life and education 
Callaghan studied physics at the University of Limerick. She moved to Imperial College London for her graduate research, where she joined Joseph Hajnal and David Larkman at Hammersmith Hospital and earned her Ph.D.  Her research considered image reconstruction using under-sampled datasets. She worked as a postdoctoral researcher at Imperial College London and Middlesex University, focusing on parallel transmit technology, lipid quantification in clinical populations and the use of nanotechnology in oncology.

Research and career 
Callaghan joined the Wellcome Centre for Human Neuroimaging in 2012. She was promoted to Deputy Head of Physics in 2013, and became Deputy Head of the Physics Group in 2013. In 2016 she was appointed Head of Physics. In 2019 she became Deputy Centre Director and in 2020 was promoted to Professor of MRI Physics.

Callaghan was responsible for the launch of 7T MRI at University College London. Her research considers advanced, microstructure brain imaging as a means to understand the structure and function of brains. She makes use of quantitative imaging to understand tissue microstructure through measurements of iron levels and myelination. In particular, 7T MRI offers hope to interrogate the neural circuitry that is involved with human cognition. She is interested in inter-individual ageing and in-vivo histology using MRI.

In 2022, Callaghan was appointed Director of the Wellcome Centre for Human Neuroimaging.

Selected publications

References 

Living people
Alumni of Imperial College London
Irish scholars and academics
Medical physicists
Alumni of the University of Limerick
Year of birth missing (living people)
Women medical researchers
Irish women scientists
Academics of University College London